Ukraine debuted in the Eurovision Song Contest 2003 with the song "Hasta la Vista" written by Svika Pick and Mirit Shem-Or. The song was performed by Oleksandr Ponomaryov, who was internally selected in February 2003 by the Ukrainian broadcaster National Television Company of Ukraine (NTU) to represent Ukraine at the 2003 contest in Riga, Latvia. The song, "Hasta la Vista", was presented to the public on 21 March 2003.

Ukraine competed in the Eurovision Song Contest which took place on 24 May 2003. Performing during the show in position 16, Ukraine placed fourteenth out of the 26 participating countries, scoring 30 points.

Background 

On 25 May 2002, the Ukrainian national broadcaster, National Television Company of Ukraine (NTU), confirmed their intentions to debut at the 2003 Eurovision Song Contest for the first time after broadcasting the 2002 contest. The nation had previously planned to debut at the Eurovision Song Contest in 1993 and 1996. NTU would also broadcast the event within Ukraine and organise the selection process for the nation's entry. The Ukrainian broadcaster internally selected the 2003 Ukrainian entry.

Before Eurovision

Internal selection 
It was reported in October 2002 by website Esctoday that NTU had internally selected Oleksandr Ponomaryov to represent Ukraine in Riga. Despite initially denying that an offer had been made by the broadcaster, Ponomaryov was confirmed as the Ukrainian entrant during a press conference on 13 February 2003. On 14 March 2003, it was announced that Ponomaryov would be performing the song "Hasta la Vista" at the Eurovision Song Contest. The song, written by Svika Pick and Mirit Shem-Or, was selected from 52 proposals received by the singer and NTU from 20 composers worldwide. Pick had previously written the Israeli Eurovision Song Contest 1998 winning song "Diva". "Hasta la Vista" was released on 21 March 2003.

Promotion
To promote "Hasta la Vista" as the Ukrainian Eurovision entry, Oleksandr Ponomaryov performed during the Latvian Eurovision national final Eirodziesma 2003 on 1 February 2003.

At Eurovision
According to Eurovision rules, all nations with the exceptions of the bottom ten countries in the 2002 contest competed in the final on 24 May 2003. On 29 November 2002, a special allocation draw was held which determined the running order and Ukraine was set to perform in position 16, following the entry from the United Kingdom and before the entry from Greece. Ukraine finished in fourteenth place with 30 points.

In Ukraine, the show was broadcast on Pershyi Natsionalnyi with commentary by reporter and television presenter Dmytro Kryzhanivskyi, and radio DJ, producer and presenter Pavlo Shylko. The Ukrainian spokesperson, who announced the Ukrainian votes during the final, was Liudmyla Khariv.

Voting 
Below is a breakdown of points awarded to Ukraine and awarded by Ukraine in the contest. The nation awarded its 12 points to Russia in the contest.

References

Bibliography 
 

Countries in the Eurovision Song Contest 2003
2003
Eurovision Song Contest